Graham Wallas (31 May 1858 – 9 August 1932) was an English socialist, social psychologist, educationalist, a leader of the Fabian Society and a co-founder of the London School of Economics.

Biography
Born in Monkwearmouth, Sunderland, Wallas was the older brother of Katharine, later to become a politician.  He was educated at Shrewsbury School and Corpus Christi College, Oxford. It was at Oxford that Wallas abandoned his religion. He taught at Highgate School until 1885, when he resigned rather than participate in communion, and was President of the Rationalist Press Association.

Wallas joined the Fabian Society in April 1886, following his acquaintances Sidney Webb and George Bernard Shaw. He was to resign in 1904 in protest at Fabian support for Joseph Chamberlain's tariff policy. In 1894 he was elected to the London School Board as a Progressive.

On 18 December 1897 he married the writer Ada Radford. The following year, they had a daughter, May Wallas, who overcame diphtheria and flu to go to Newnham College, Cambridge, like her mother.

Wallas became chair of the board's school management committee in 1897, and until he was defeated in 1907, the encouragement of educational reform and the raising of academic standards in state schools were some his main activities.

He was appointed a university extension lecturer in 1890 and lectured at the newly-founded London School of Economics from 1895. In 1898, he published a biography of the early-19th-century utilitarian radical Francis Place. His most important academic writings were Human Nature in Politics (1908) and its successors, Great Society (1914) and Our Social Heritage (1921).

Ideas
Wallas argued in The Great Society: A Psychological Analysis (1914) that a social-psychological analysis could explain the problems created by the impact of the Industrial Revolution on modern society. He contrasted the role of nature and nurture in modern society, concluded that humanity must depend largely on the improvements in nurture and put his faith in the development of stronger international operation.

In The Art of Thought (1926), he drew on the work of Hermann von Helmholtz and Henri Poincaré to propose one of the first complete models of the creative process, as consisting of the four-stage process of preparation (or saturation), incubation, illumination, and verification), which remains highly cited in scholarly works on creativity.

Works

References

Further reading
 Martin Wiener (1971). Between Two Worlds: the political thought of Graham Wallas, Oxford: Clarendon Press
 Asitananda Roy, The Psychological Politics of Graham Walls

External links

 
 
 Works by Graham Wallas, at Hathi Trust
 Catalogue of the Wallas papers at the Archives Division of the London School of Economics.
 Spartacus bio

1858 births
1932 deaths
Academics of the London School of Economics
British sociologists
Education activists
English political philosophers
English psychologists
English socialists
Social psychologists
Alumni of Corpus Christi College, Oxford
People educated at Shrewsbury School
People from Sunderland
Members of London County Council
Members of the Fabian Society
Progressive Party (London) politicians
Members of the London School Board
Educational researchers